Aadhavan is a 2009 Indian Tamil-language action comedy film directed by K. S. Ravikumar and written by Ramesh Khanna. The film stars Suriya and Nayantara, with Vadivelu, Murali, B. Saroja Devi, Rahul Dev, Sayaji Shinde, Anand Babu in supporting cast. The music was composed by Harris Jayaraj. 

The film released on 17 October 2009 to mixed reviews but became a hit at the box office. It was dubbed in Hindi as Dildaar – The Arya in 2011 and in Telugu as Ghatikudu. The core plot of the movie was loosely based on the 1990 Malayalam movie His Highness Abdullah. The film was remade in Bengali  as Shikari.

Plot
In the United States, an unknown client is shown speaking to a mafia group to eradicate a fake godman. The mafia group arranges the hit through a middleman who is in Kolkata, as the fake godman will be arriving there. The Middleman then gives the contract to Ibrahim Rowther. The fake godman is then killed by an unknown who is revealed to be Ibrahim Rowther's adopted son, Aadhavan. Aadhavan is a skilled hitman working with Ibrahim Rowther and adopted older brother Tharani. Aadhavan then gets several contracts in various parts of the world as a result of eradicating the fake godman. As a result, the trio gets richer. In Mumbai, Aadhavan meets Dr. Abdul Kulkarni, who hires to him kill a prominent Judge named Subramaniam, since he is handling the inquiry and verdict on Abdul's child kidnapping and organ trafficking cases in Kolkata. Aadhavan attempts to snipe Subramaniam, but fails at the first attempt seemingly. After that, Dr. Abdul Kulkarni insults him for his failure to kill Subramaniam. Aadhavan then becomes furious and vows to kill Subramaniam within ten days. He threatens Subramaniam's servant Kuppan aka Bannerjee to help him get into the house as Murugan, Bannerjee's brother in law, by abducting the actual Murugan and have him held in his ship.

Slowly, Aadhavan begins to win over the members of Subramaniam's household – his mother, her beautiful granddaughter, Thara and his other relatives. Thara is attracted to Murugan's (Aadhavan) intelligence and simple-innocent nature. Aadhavan tries to assassinate Subramaniam at home in the middle of the night and also plants a bomb in Subramaniam's van, but both attempts fail. Meanwhile, Subramaniam's entire family is on a trip to Darjeeling, and Thara asks Aadhavan to hide a guitar belonging to Ilaiyaman, her madcap musician cousin. Aadhavan uses this opportunity, plants a mobile bomb in the guitar and places it in one of the cars, which explodes at the wrong time, thereby failing to kill Subramaniam yet again. Meanwhile, a security officer, who is the chief of the security team protecting Subramaniam at Subramaniam's house keeps informing Dr. Abdul Kulkarni of Aadhavan's entry into the house and all his signs of progress and failed attempts. Thara is now suspicious about Aadhavan, but when she questions him in secret, he informs her that he is really Subramaniam's long lost runaway son Madhavan. Thara soon informs all the members of the household about Madhavan's return, and they are overjoyed, with Thara and Aadhavan falling in love.

However, they hide it from Subramaniam and Ilaiyaman, because of the former's hatred towards Madhavan. Aadhavan, however, tells Bannerjee that he lied to Thara about being Madhavan to distract her suspicions and that he really is not him at all. However, on Thara's birthday, a flashback reveals that Aadhavan is indeed Madhavan. Years ago, a ten-year-old Madhavan unknowingly carries a gift with a hidden bomb for his cousin Thara's birthday. His friend's mother plants the bomb in the toy to avenge Subramaniam for her gangster husband's jail sentence. Though Thara survives, her mother, Anu opens the box and is killed along with her husband in the explosion. Subramaniam blames Madhavan for his sister, Anu's death and for his friendship with a gangster's son and thrashes him. In anger and fear of going to a juvenile prison, Madhavan steals a gun from the cops and accidentally shoots his father, Subramaniam and runs away from home. He kills his friend's mother as she is responsible for his aunt, Anu's death. He saves Ibrahim Rowther, then a local goon from death, is in turn adopted as his son, and rechristened him as 'Aadhavan'.

Tharani tried to kill Subramanium, is stopped by Madhavan and reveals his true identity that he is the son of Subramanium. Ibrahim Rowther challenges that he will kill them within two days. Dr. Abdul Kulkarni is fed up with the repeated failed attempts of Madhavan. So, he makes another plan, threatens Ibrahim and his gang to surrender to the police, and make a confession about Madhavan and his plans. When the Assistant Commissioner of police confronts Madhavan and is about to have him hauled off, Madhavan gets Subramaniam's laptop containing the verdict and inquiry reports, takes him and Thara as hostages and drives away. Not before stealing the Assistant Commissioner of police's gun, using to injure him, the guards, when they intervene on him, but even killing the security chief. In the meanwhile, the police commissioner arrives, arrests the Assistant Commissioner of police, as it is revealed to be another informer for Dr. Abdul Kulkarni and makes a confession that the police actually had caught Madhavan after his very first attempt to kill Subramaniam had failed. When questioned by the commissioner, Madhavan said that he backed off and misfired on purpose at the last moment, after he found that he was going to kill his own father, Subramaniam. The police then ask him to go back to the house to protect Subramaniam over a 24/7 hiatus time every day, for which he agrees.

The Commissioner uses Madhavan to nab individuals linked to various criminal & terrorist organizations. This information is relayed to Subramaniam by the commissioner, who is tearfully grateful to his son, Madhavan. Meanwhile, Dr. Abdul Kulkarni attacks the vehicle in which the trio are travelling, and a fight ensues where Madhavan saves Subramaniam and Thara, and Dr. Abdul Kulkarni is killed. The Minister & the middleman that was involved in the contract killings get arrested. Madhavan serves a short term in prison for his previous wrongdoings, but is subsequently released from the prison for his contribution to saving Subramaniam. Madhavan and Thara are now married, live in the household with the huge family. Once yet again, Bannerjee brings two assistants are also his brother-in-laws to help him and asks approval from Subramainam, who then consulted in Madhavan, to check them out, with the whole family being suspicious of them being secretly hitmen. Upon inquiring on them, he approves of them with the whole family accepting them.

Cast

 Suriya as Madhavan a.k.a. Aadhavan / Murugan
 Nayantara as Thara, Madhavan's cousin and wife
 Vadivelu as Banner-Kuppan (Bannerji)
 Murali as Subramaniam, Madhavan's Father
 Saroja Devi as Rajalakshmi, Subramaniam's Mother
 Rahul Dev as Dr. Abdul Kulkarni
 Sayaji Shinde as Ibrahim Rowther , Aadhavan's Foster Father (Voice dubbed by Prithviraj)
 Anand Babu as Tharani, Aadhavan's Foster brother
 Ramesh Khanna as Kuppusamy (Ilaiyamaan)
 FEFSI Vijayan as Police Commissioner Rathnavelu
 Sathyan as Murugan, Bannerjee's Nephew
 Riyaz Khan as ACP Deva
 Manobala as Sundaramurthy, Subramaniam's Young Brother
 Alex as Vasudevan, Subramaniam's Young Brother
 Jaya Rekha as Rani, Subramaniam's Young Sister-in-Law
 Anu Hasan as  Anu, Thara's Mother, Madhavan's aunt
 Neelu Nasreen
Ananda Kannan

Additionally, the director (K. S. Ravikumar) and the producer (Udhayanidhi Stalin) make guest appearances as servants at the end of the film.

Production
The song "Eno Eno Panithuli" was shot at Iceland, making Aadhavan the first South Indian film to be shot there. Shooting also took place at the Chettinad Palace, MRC Nagar, Chennai.

Soundtrack

The soundtrack features 6 tracks composed by Harris Jayaraj. The soundtrack was released on 19 August by S. Shankar. The album received positive reviews from critics, with praise being dedicated to the songs "Hasili Fisile" and "Vaarayo Vaarayo". Malathy Sundaram from Behindwoods said, "There is a lot of technical finesse to this album. What surprises us here is the banality of the lyrics! One would have expected better lyrics from all these songwriters! Harris Jayaraj has consciously used various instruments to add appeal to this album." Pavithra Srinivasan from Rediff said "Harris Jeyaraj is one of those composers who is not capable of turning out bad stuff even on a bad day, this album stands out from a mile away." Due to the album's critical and commercial success, Harris Jayaraj received the Vijay Award for Best Music Director and was also nominated for the Filmfare Award for Best Music Director.

Release
The satellite rights of the film were sold to Kalaignar.

Critical reception
Behindwoods gave a 2.85 out of 5 and gave a verdict "Carefree commercial – Conditions apply". Sify.com gave a positive review stating, "Ranging through a wide field of comedy laced with action, Aadhavan is good fun while it lasts. It's a roller-coaster ride of pure unadulterated masala".Rediff rated the movie with 2.85 out of 5 stars and ended the review with "Aadhavan is uncomplicated, clean, fun, and doesn't expect you to take it seriously." Nowrunning.com also rated it as 2.85 on 5 and Aravindan D I specially said "Aadhavan could have been good entertainment, but is marred by inconsistent script." while Indiaglitz gave the verdict "above average" and stated, "Aadhavan is a movie that would bring joy to mass action lovers and front-benchers.". Malathi Rangarajan from The Hindu wrote "Post-interval, you have to wait quite a while for some concrete action from Aadhavan, the Infallible!"

Box office
The film grossed ₹4.76 cr from Chennai box office in its 8 weeks. The film grossed good numbers in Malaysia as well as UK. Overseas, the film grossed about $1,541,485, approximately.
The film was  a hit at the box office. The film was dubbed into Telugu as Ghatikudu. It was also dubbed into Hindi as Dildaar: The Arya.

Awards and nominations

Remake
The movie was remade in Bengali  as Shikari starring Bangladeshi superstar Shakib Khan. Shikari is a 2016 Bangladesh-India joint venture action thriller drama film directed by Joydeep Mukherjee and Zakir Hossain Simanto.

References

External links
 

Films set in Kolkata
2009 films
Films shot in Kolkata
Films shot in Iceland
Films directed by K. S. Ravikumar
2000s Tamil-language films
Indian action comedy films
Films scored by Harris Jayaraj
Tamil films remade in other languages
Films about contract killing in India
2009 action comedy films
2009 action thriller films